Whittington is a small village near Worcester close to Junction 7 of the M5 motorway, bounded by the motorway and the B4084, in the District of Wychavon.  The motorway cuts through the village, most of it being on the west side but some houses were left on the east side.

Amenities 

There is one public house – The Swan, a village and parish church, and an active village hall.

The village has a primary school.

History 

There is an ancient burial mound referred to as Whittington Tump or just "The Tump" across the A44 road from the public house.  The tump is thought to have been a barrow but no burial remains have been found there. The hill was built by the order of Oliver Cromwell where soldiers used their helmets to carry dirt to build the hill in celebration of the victory of the battle of Worcester. The context of this ancient monument was significantly diminished by the building of the M5 motorway a very short distance away, further damage being caused by the widening of the A44, which was rebuilt to bypass the village. It was then damaged again by the building on the north side of the Tump of the road going west to the new crossing of the River Severn south of Worcester.

Tump is Worcestershire dialect for a small hill and may be derived from the Welsh language word Twmpath. An unty tump is a molehill, unty being local dialect for a mole.

The parish of Whittington also includes the hamlet of Swinesherd, part of which was also lost to the building of the M5 motorway.

External links

Whittington village website
The village church website

Villages in Worcestershire
Wychavon